The members of the 25th Knesset were elected on 1 November 2022 and sworn in on 15 November.

Composition
One Druze lawmaker, 29 women, 23 new MKs and three openly gay MKs were elected to the 25th Knesset. The number of Arab MKs was the lowest in two decades with 10 MKs.

Members of the Knesset

Replacements

See also
Thirty-seventh government of Israel
Party lists for the 2022 Israeli legislative election

References

External links

 Members of the 25th Knesset, Knesset website

 
25
Israel